The men's tournament of basketball at the 2017 Summer Universiade in Taipei began on August 20 and ended on August 29.

Teams 

 The United States was represented by Purdue University.

Preliminary round

Group A 

|}

Group B 

|}

Group C 

|}

Group D 

|}

Classification rounds

Quarterfinal round

17th–24th place

9th–16th place

Semifinal round

21st–24th place

17th–20th place

13th–16th place

9th–12th place

5th–8th place

Final round

23rd place game

21st place game

19th place game

17th place game

15th place game

13th place game

11th place game

9th place game

7th place game

5th place game

Championship playoffs

Quarterfinals

Semifinals

Bronze medal game

Gold medal game

Final standings

References 
 

Men's
Purdue Boilermakers men's basketball